Younoussa Bamana (born April 1, 1935 in Kani Keli, Mayotte, and died June 22, 2007) was a politician from Mayotte who served in the French National Assembly from 1977 to 1981 .

On June 23, 2008, a postage stamp showing Younoussa Bamana was issued.

Since 2010, there was a high school named Younoussa-Bamana (LYB) located in Mamoudzou.

References 
 

1935 births
2007 deaths
People from Mayotte
Mayotte politicians
Union for French Democracy politicians
Deputies of the 5th National Assembly of the French Fifth Republic
Deputies of the 6th National Assembly of the French Fifth Republic
Presidents of the General Council of Mayotte